The Book of Pooh is an American children's television series that aired on the Playhouse Disney block on Disney Channel. It is the third television series to feature the characters from the Disney franchise based on A. A. Milne's works; the other two were the live action Welcome to Pooh Corner (to which this series bears resemblance) and the animated The New Adventures of Winnie the Pooh which ran from 1988 to 1991. It premiered on January 22, 2001 and completed its run on November 29, 2004. It was repeated on Playhouse Disney until June 2, 2006 (May 2007 in the UK). The show is produced by Shadow Projects. Walt Disney Pictures released the first of two films, a direct-to-video spin-off film based on the puppetry television series titled The Book of Pooh: Stories from the Heart in 2001.

The show became available to stream on Disney+ on its launch, November 12, 2019.

Overview
The series take places after the events of Milne's original stories since his son Christopher Robin is clearly a Year 7 and 11 years old. The series departs from many of the established facts of Milne's books; for example, Tigger resides in the Hundred Acre Wood from the start and Kanga and Roo are later introduced as newcomers. Neither Christopher nor his mother speak with an English accent, such is the case in The New Adventures of Winnie the Pooh where Christopher has an American accent. Kessie, the bluebird from The New Adventures of Winnie the Pooh episodes "Find Her, Keep Her" and "A Bird in the Hand" returns as a main character in this series.

Each show begins entering Christopher Robin's bedroom and hearing his mother say "Christopher, time for school." Christopher Robin answers "OK, Mum", grabs his backpack and leaves. This is where the book with Pooh and his friends in it opens and the theme song begins. The show can be viewed as non-canonical in other ways. For example, Tigger can climb up—but more importantly climb down from trees and Christopher Robin's face is never shown. Plus, Rabbit lives in a tree, as opposed to living in a burrow in other adaptations.

Cast
The characters in the show regularly sing and dance in ways that enhance the story being told. Many of the episodes do not have much basis in the original stories by A.A. Milne besides the characters.

The production design of the show was done by Chris Renaud, who would later become the co-director of the 2010 film Despicable Me.

The characters who appear regularly and the actors who voice them are:
 Winnie the Pooh and Tigger: Jim Cummings
 Piglet: John Fiedler (speaking voice)/Jeff Bennett (singing voice)
 Rabbit: Ken Sansom 
 Eeyore: Peter Cullen
 Owl: Andre Stojka
 Kessie: Stephanie D'Abruzzo
 Kanga: Kath Soucie
 Roo: Nikita Hopkins
 Christopher Robin: Paul Tiesler
 Christopher Robin's Mum: Vicki Kenderes Eibner
 Mr. Narrator: Roger L. Jackson

The versions of Tigger and Pooh are seen on this show was later made an appearance in a music video by the We Are Family foundation.

Puppeteers

Heather Asch
Peter Baird
Jennifer Barnhart - Kanga 
Carol Binion
Ron Binion
Matthew Brooks
Tyler Bunch - Tigger
Todd Coyle
Stephanie D'Abruzzo - Kessie
Sophie Doyle
Vicki Kenderes-Eibner
Jodi Eichelberger
Eric Engelhardt
David Matthew Feldman
Chris Fields
John C. Fields
Preston Foreder
James Godwin
B.J. Guyer
Robin Howard
Eric Jacobson - Piglet
Liz Joyce

Jim Kroupa
Tim Lagasse
Matthew Lavin
Peter Linz - Winnie the Pooh
Jon Ludwig
Rick Lyon
Lara MacLean - Roo
Noel MacNeal - Rabbit
Amanda Maddock
David Martin
Cathy McCullough
Paul McGinnis - Eeyore
Anney McKilligan
John Pavlik
Barbara Pollitt
John Tartaglia
Robin Walsh
Dan Weissbrodt
Steve Widerman
Alice Dinnean-Vernon
Victor Yerrid - Owl
Bryant Young

Style of puppetry
The style of puppetry is based on Japanese bunraku puppetry, and that — along with the cut-out-styled backgrounds — gives the show the look of a pop-up book, hence "The Book of Pooh". It was the first use of the Shadowmation process developed by creator Mitchell Kriegman which was later used in the PBS series It's a Big Big World.

Main themes
 "Everyone Knows He's Winnie the Pooh" (opening theme) - Brian Woodbury
 "Goodbye for Now" (closing theme) - Brian Woodbury and Mitchell Kriegman

Episodes

Series overview

Season 1 (2001)

Season 2 (2001–04)

Awards and nominations
The series received three Emmy Awards nominations, and tied with Sesame Street for Outstanding Directing in a Children's Series at the 29th Daytime Emmy Awards in 2002.

Film 

The Book of Pooh: The Stories from the Heart is a direct-to-video animated spin-off based on the television series The Book of Pooh. It was produced by Walt Disney Pictures. The film was distributed by Buena Vista Television, produced by Shadow Projects and Walt Disney Television Animation and released on both VHS and DVD.

It contains 6 episodes, each of which focuses on one character. It is wrapped together by a loose plot in which the characters wait in Christopher Robin's room for his arrival. As is typical with the series, each episode features an original musical number. It is a compilation film of footage from the TV series.

Home media
Several VHS Tapes were released in 2001 and 2002: 
  
Fun with Words 
The Words Are Out
Brain Drain
I Could Have Laughed All Night 
X Marks the Spot

Fun with Friends
You Can Lead Eeyore to the Books 
The Spice of Life 
Best Wishes Winnie the Pooh 
The Double Time

A Valentine for Eeyore
My Gloomy Valentine 
Mr. Narrator 
Don Pooh Xote
The Beastly Burden

See also
 Welcome to Pooh Corner
 The New Adventures of Winnie the Pooh
 My Friends Tigger & Pooh

References

External links
 

2001 American television series debuts
2004 American television series endings
2000s American children's comedy television series
2000s American musical comedy television series
2000s preschool education television series
American children's fantasy television series
American children's musical television series
American preschool education television series
American television spin-offs
American television shows featuring puppetry
Disney Channel original programming
Disney Junior original programming
English-language television shows
Television series about bears
Television series based on Disney films
Television series by Disney
Winnie the Pooh (franchise)
Winnie-the-Pooh television series